Bishop's Palace may refer to the official residence of any bishop, such as those listed in the :Category:Episcopal palaces.

Specific residences called Bishop's Palace include:

Poland
 Palace of the Kraków Bishops in Kielce, Poland
 Bishop's Palace, Kraków, Poland

United Kingdom

England
 Bishop's Palace, Auckland, County Durham
 Bishop's Waltham Palace, Hampshire
 Bishop's Palace, Bromley, Kent
 Old Bishop's Palace, Chester, Cheshire
 Lambeth Palace, London
 Bishop's Palace, Lichfield, Staffordshire
 Lincoln Medieval Bishop's Palace, Lincolnshire
 Sonning Bishop's Palace, Berkshire
 Bishop's Palace, Wells, Somerset
 Bishopthorpe Palace, North Yorkshire
 The Old Palace, Worcester, Worcestershire

Scotland
 Bishop's Palace, Kirkwall, Orkney

Wales
 Lamphey Bishop's Palace, Pembrokeshire
 Bishop's Palace, Llandaff, Cardiff
 Mathern Palace, Monmouthshire
 St Davids Bishops Palace, Pembrokeshire

Other places
 Prince-Bishops' Palace (Liège), Belgium
 Kroměříž Bishop's Palace, Czech Republic
 Bishop's Palace, Castres, France
 Würzburg Residence, of the Prince-Bishop of Würzburg, Germany
 Bishop's Palace, Birgu, Malta
 Bishop's Palace, Mdina, Malta
 Bishop's Palace, Valletta, Malta
 Bishop's Palace of Astorga, Spain
 Old Bishop's Palace in Oslo, Norway
 Bishop's Palace, Galveston, Texas, United States

See also
 Archbishop's Palace (disambiguation)
 Episcopal Palace (disambiguation)
 Electoral Palace (disambiguation)